Cantrell is a surname of English and French origin. Notable people with the surname include:

Arthur Cantrell (1883-1954), English cricketer and Royal Marines officer
Cantrell (Middlesex cricketer)
Blu Cantrell, R&B singer
Cady Cantrell, model
Charles P. Cantrell, American Medal of Honor recipient
Dylan Cantrell (born 1994), American football player
 Gary Cantrell, aka Lazarus Lake, American endurance race designer and director
 Hunter Cantrell, American politician
Jerry Cantrell, guitarist from Alice in Chains
Julie Cantrell, American author and editor
Lana Cantrell, Australian-American singer, lawyer, Order of Australia awardee
LaToya Cantrell, American politician currently serving as the Mayor of New Orleans
Laura Cantrell, singer and DJ
Norda Cantrell, another name for the comic character Northwind
Paul Cantrell (1895-1962), American businessman and politician
Peter Cantrell, cricketer
Will Cantrell, character in the movie Dark Command
Cantrell (rapper), American hip-hop artist

See also
 Cantril (disambiguation)

English-language surnames